Legends of Notre Dame, commonly referred to as Legends, is a music venue, public house, and restaurant located on the campus of the University of Notre Dame, just 100 yards south of Notre Dame Stadium. The former Alumni Senior Club opened its doors the first weekend in September 2003 after a $3.5 million renovation and transformed into the all-ages student hang-out that currently exists.

The Legends of Notre Dame Restaurant and Alehouse Pub is a full-service, casual dining operation which is open to the public for lunch and dinner Monday through Sunday.  The nightclub at Legends of Notre Dame, on the other hand, is only open to Notre Dame, Saint Mary's College and Holy Cross College students and their guests. When the nightclub is not being used for student programming, it is open to be rented for private functions, such as business meetings, receptions, luncheons, and banquets. The club and the associated outdoor area, also called "The Backfield", becomes a popular destination for fans on football weekends.

History 
Legends of Notre Dame opened in the fall of 2003. Formerly the Alumni Senior Club, the building underwent a $3.5 million renovation and increased by nearly 50% in size. This transformation was made possible largely by a gift from current Chairman of the Board of Trustees, Richard Notebart. The project was directed by Assistant Vice President for Student Activities, M. Brian Coughlin, and Vice President for Student Affairs, Rev. Mark Poorman CSC.

The idea behind the creation of this venue was to enhance student culture and provide a state-of-the-art facility with national entertainment. At the onset, it was decided that alcohol would never be the focus of any event at Legends, yet the option would be available to those who are of legal drinking age to responsibly consume alcohol in a safe and quality environment.

Structure

Restaurant and Alehouse
The Legends of Notre Dame Restaurant and Alehouse Pub is a full-service, casual dining operation which is open to the public for lunch and dinner Monday through Sunday, along with being open for breakfast on football Saturdays in the fall. All proceeds from the restaurant and alehouse pub are used to support social programming for Notre Dame students at Legends. The restaurant features 23 draught beer lines, 70 bottle beer options, a large selection of craft and micro-brews, wine and spirits, a diverse menu, a timeline of Notre Dame sports history, and 14 High-Definition plasma TVs. Executive chef Giuseppe Macerata was featured multiple times on South Bend's WSJV Fox 28 news cooking segment "Wake Up!".

Nightclub
The nightclub at Legends of Notre Dame is only open to Notre Dame, Saint Mary's College and Holy Cross College students and their guests. Every  Thursday, Friday and Saturday night during the academic year the club offers free live entertainment in the form of concerts, comedy shows, nightclubs and beyond. There are six events per weekend at Legends featuring live entertainment at 10:00 pm and a nightclub at midnight, which can stay open until as late as 4:00 am.

On Thursday nights, Legends hosts low-key events such as “Brew and View” midnight movies, dart tournaments, open pool play, club jazz, karaoke, speed dating, or guitar hero competitions. On Friday and Saturday nights, a danceclub begins with a DJ, intelligent lighting, and a party atmosphere. Most every nightclub is attached to a theme, or more specifically to a style of music (salsa, reggaeton, hip hop, bhangra, swing, country, etc.) Notable acts that have performed at Legends include Young Dubliners, Plain White T's, Tim Reynolds, Stroke 9, Ryan Cabrera, Sara Bareilles, Gavin DeGraw, and Matt and Kim.

Other functions
When the nightclub is not being used for student programming, it is open to be rented for private functions, such as business meetings, receptions, luncheons and banquets. The club and the associated outdoor area called “The Backfield” becomes a popular destination for fans on football weekends.

Awards
Legends was recognized as one of the top 12 nightclub music venues in the country on February 7, 2008 at the Pollstar Music Industry Awards at the Nokia Theater in Los Angeles, California, but did not make it as a finalist. The 9:30 Club in Washington, DC took first place.

See also 
 University of Notre Dame
 Notre Dame, Our Mother
 University of Notre Dame residence halls
 Notre Dame Fighting Irish football

References

External links 
 Official site
 The University of Notre Dame
 The University of Notre Dame's Student Activities Office

University of Notre Dame buildings and structures
2003 establishments in Indiana
Music venues completed in 2003
Drinking establishments in Indiana
Restaurants established in 2003
Restaurants in Indiana